John U. Zuta (February 15, 1888 – August 1, 1930) was an accountant and political "fixer" for the Chicago Outfit and the North Side Gang.

Early life
Zuta (also spelled as "Zoota") was born on February 18, 1888, in the Russian Empire to a peasant family who practiced Orthodox Judaism. He immigrated to the United States around 1913. Living in Chicago, Zuta worked as a junk dealer on the West Side before becoming involved in prostitution. He eventually operated several brothels on west Madison Street. However he was ordered to hand over his operation to his competitors Mike "The Pike" Heitler and the Guzik Brothers, Harry and Jake "Greasy Thumb" Guzik.

Mob accountant
Zuta began working for Al Capone in the mid-1920s. He helped contribute $50,000 of Capone's money to Chicago Mayor William Hale Thompson's reelection campaign in 1927. However, Zuta defected to Bugs Moran's North Side Gang during the gang war between Capone and Moran.

In June 1930, Moran and Zuta allegedly ordered the assassination of mobbed-up Chicago Tribune reporter Jake Lingle after Lingle demanded a cut of their illegal gambling operations on the Chicago Outfit's behalf. After the murder (for which former Egan's Rats gangster Leo Vincent Brothers was convicted), Zuta was arrested and questioned by police. He was released the next day. While being given a police escort the police cruiser was fired on by several unidentified gunmen. The attackers killed two bystanders before being driven off by police. Zuta fled Chicago, and hid out in Upper Nemahbin Lake, west of Milwaukee, living under the alias "J. H. Goodman". Zuta was shot to death, most likely by the Chicago Outfit in revenge for the murder of Lingle, on August 1, 1930, at a roadhouse in Delafield, Wisconsin. He lies buried in the Jewish cemetery located in Middlesboro, Kentucky.

Aftermath
Zuta's death exposed a large amount of political corruption in Illinois. Zuta, a meticulous record keeper, had much information later found in various safe deposit boxes. This information lead to the confiscation of a large whiskey shipment intended for Moran and to information about police raids on several breweries, as well as detailing kickbacks by the North Side Gang to both state and city officials.

Some of the officials implicated were: 
Chicago Alderman Dorsey Crowe
Board of Education executive Nate DeLue
Judge Joseph W. Schulman
ex-Judge Emanuel Eller
Chicago Police Department Sergeant Martin C. Mulvihill
Evanston Police Chief William O. Freeman
Illinois Senator Harry W. Starr

All denied involvement, however, particularly Crowe and Starr, who insisted that the money was campaign contributions rather than bribes. I'm reference to Lingpe's murder, the name, "Zuta", later became slang for a revenge killing. In 1931, after a $50,000 bounty was placed on his head, Capone joked, "Nobody's gonna' 'Zuta' me."

See also 
 List of homicides in Wisconsin

References

Further reading
Kelly, Robert J. Encyclopedia of Organized Crime in the United States. Westport, Connecticut: Greenwood Press, 2000. 
Sifakis, Carl. The Mafia Encyclopedia. New York: Da Capo Press, 2005.

External links
My Al Capone Museum - Jack Zuta
Jack Zuta – Angina from the Grave by Allan May

1888 births
1930 deaths
Al Capone associates
Murdered American gangsters
Chicago Outfit mobsters
North Side Gang
Prohibition-era gangsters
American accountants
American gangsters
American people of Russian-Jewish descent
Murdered Jewish American gangsters
People murdered in Wisconsin
Deaths by firearm in Wisconsin
Emigrants from the Russian Empire to the United States